Petukhovo is a town and the administrative center of Petukhovsky District in Kurgan Oblast, Russia, located on the Ishim Plain  southeast of Kurgan, the administrative center of the oblast. Population:  It is located on the Kazakhstan–Russia border.

History
It was founded in 1892 as a settlement around a railway station of the Trans-Siberian Railway. In 1899, Petukhovo merged with the nearby village of Yudino. In 1944, it was granted town status.

Administrative and municipal status
Within the framework of administrative divisions, Petukhovo serves as the administrative center of Petukhovsky District. As an administrative division, it is incorporated within Petukhovsky District as Petukhovo Town Under District Jurisdiction. As a municipal division, Petukhovo Town Under District Jurisdiction is incorporated within Petukhovsky Municipal District as Petukhovo Urban Settlement.

References

Notes

Sources

External links
Unofficial website of Petukhovo 

Cities and towns in Kurgan Oblast